Alexander Riemann (born 12 April 1992) is a German professional footballer who plays as a forward. He is the younger brother of football goalkeeper Manuel Riemann.

Career
In 2010, Riemann had his debut for VfB Stuttgart II in the 3. Liga. For the 2012–13 season he was loaned out to SV Sandhausen.

References

External links
 
 

1992 births
Living people
People from Mühldorf
Sportspeople from Upper Bavaria
German footballers
Footballers from Bavaria
Association football forwards
Germany youth international footballers
2. Bundesliga players
3. Liga players
Austrian Football Bundesliga players
VfB Stuttgart II players
SV Sandhausen players
SV Wehen Wiesbaden players
FC Wacker Innsbruck (2002) players
LASK players
VfL Osnabrück players
SV Wacker Burghausen players
German expatriate footballers
German expatriate sportspeople in Austria
Expatriate footballers in Austria